Alfred Village Historic District is a national historic district located at Alfred in Allegany County, New York, in the United States. Structures in the district date from about 1818 to the 1930s and include a variety of popular American architectural styles. The district is predominantly residential with occasional examples of commercial, religious, and civic architecture. The most striking feature of the district is the wealth and quality of terra cotta as a building material and for decorative detail.

It was listed on the National Register of Historic Places in 1992.

References

Historic districts on the National Register of Historic Places in New York (state)
Gothic Revival architecture in New York (state)
Historic districts in Allegany County, New York
National Register of Historic Places in Allegany County, New York